Irvin van Kerwel (born 27 May 1963) is a South African cricket umpire. He has stood in matches in the 2016–17 Sunfoil 3-Day Cup and the 2016–17 CSA Provincial One-Day Challenge tournaments.

References

External links
 

1963 births
Living people
South African cricket umpires
People from Stellenbosch